The 2022–23 Polish Basketball League (PLK) season, the Energa Basket Liga for sponsorship reasons, is the 89th season of the Polish Basketball League, the highest professional basketball league in Poland. Śląsk Wrocław are the defending champions.

Teams 
16 teams will participate this season.

HydroTruck Radom was relegated and Sokół Łańcut will be promoted from Liga I.

Locations and venues

Regular season

League table

Results

Awards
All official awards of the 2022–23 PLK season.

MVP of the Round

MVP of the Month

Polish clubs in European competitions

Polish clubs in Regional competitions

References

External links
Polska Liga Koszykówki - Official Site 
Polish League at Eurobasket.com

Polish Basketball League seasons
Poland
PLK
Poland